Robert Allen McAdoo Jr. (born September 25, 1951) is an American former professional basketball player and coach. He played 14 seasons in the  National Basketball Association (NBA), where he was a five-time NBA All-Star and named the NBA Most Valuable Player (MVP) in 1975. He won two NBA championships with the Los Angeles Lakers during their Showtime era in the 1980s. In 2000, McAdoo was inducted into the Naismith Basketball Hall of Fame. He was named to the NBA 75th Anniversary Team in 2021.

McAdoo played center for the majority of his career. In his 21-season playing career, he spent 14 seasons in the NBA and his final seven in the Lega Basket Serie A in Italy. McAdoo is one of the few players who have won both NBA and the FIBA European Champions Cup (EuroLeague) titles as a player. He later won three more NBA titles in 2006, 2012 and 2013 as an assistant coach with the Miami Heat.

Early life
McAdoo was raised in Greensboro, North Carolina. His mother, Vandalia, taught at his grade school, and his father, Robert, was a custodian at North Carolina A&T University. McAdoo attended Ben L. Smith High School, where he not only participated in basketball and track but was also in the marching band as a saxophone player.

As a senior, he led Smith to the state basketball semifinals as well as to the state track tournament, where he set a new state high-jump record of 6'7", beating out future North Carolina teammate Bobby Jones.

College career
Out of high school, McAdoo initially lacked the academic test scores required by the Division I schools, so he chose to enroll at Vincennes University, then a junior college, in Vincennes, Indiana from 1969 through 1971. Vincennes University won the NJCAA Men's Division I Basketball Championship in 1970, with McAdoo scoring 27 points in the championship game. His roommate was teammate Foots Walker. McAdoo was named a Junior College All-American as a sophomore in 1971.

At Vincennes, McAdoo averaged 19.3 points and 10 rebounds in 1969–70 and 25.0 points and 11.0 rebounds in 1970–71.

McAdoo played for Team USA at the 1971 Pan American Games, in the summer of 1971, averaging 11.0 points per game.

"We didn't really recruit him," Coach Dean Smith of North Carolina said. "His mother called us to start it. She said all the other schools were recruiting him. Why weren't we?"

McAdoo enrolled at the University of North Carolina in 1971, the only junior college player Dean Smith recruited in his career. McAdoo, playing alongside Bobby Jones, led the 1971–72 Tar Heels, coached by Dean Smith, to a 26–5 record and the Final Four of the 1972 NCAA University Division basketball tournament. McAdoo averaged 19.5 points and 10.1 rebounds. He was named first-team All-American. He also earned MVP honors at the ACC tournament.

Citing family hardship, McAdoo sought and won early eligibility for the 1972 NBA draft under the "hardship" clause that existed until 1977. McAdoo consulted with Coach Dean Smith, who encouraged him to go to the NBA.

McAdoo said, "When I left, a lot of people were very angry and upset. But Dean gave me his blessing. He told me, ‘If they’re going to offer you this kind of money, I think you should leave to help you and your family.’ I had his blessing. My mother was totally against it,” McAdoo added, “but my father and Dean Smith were the guys who got me to move.”

Professional career

1972 ABA and NBA drafts 
McAdoo sought and won early eligibility in the 1972 NBA draft.

However, it was rumored that McAdoo had signed with the Virginia Squires of the rival American Basketball Association after a "secret" ABA draft in which names of those drafted were not made public. Even though no contract was produced and McAdoo denied, reportedly, NBA Commissioner Walter Kennedy advised NBA teams not to draft McAdoo. Other reports were that a contract was signed and voided, because McAdoo was too young to have signed it and that Buffalo somehow knew this. Later, McAdoo was indeed noted as the No. 1 pick of the 1972 American Basketball Association Draft.

Buffalo Braves (1972–1976) 

Buffalo acted anyway, and McAdoo was selected with the No. 2 overall pick by the Buffalo Braves (now the Los Angeles Clippers), after rumors that contract talks between the Portland Trail Blazers and McAdoo didn't come to fruition with the first pick. LaRue Martin was selected by Portland. McAdoo signed with the Braves and quickly became one of the NBA's premier players. He won the 1973 NBA Rookie of the Year Award and was named to the NBA All-Rookie First Team. He earned the first of three consecutive NBA scoring titles in only his second season.

McAdoo was frustrated with Buffalo's losing in his rookie season, saying,  "Here I was sitting at Buffalo, we were on the way to losing 61 games and we didn't have any players. My wife could have outrun those people."

His second season (1973–74) remains the last time an NBA player has averaged both 30.0 points and 15.0 rebounds per game. McAdoo also led the NBA in field goal percentage in 1973–74, shooting 54.7 percent. That year he enjoyed his first of five All-Star selections, and led Buffalo to its first playoffs appearance, though they would lose in the first round to Dave Cowens and the eventual-champion Celtics.

In 1974–75, he was awarded the NBA Most Valuable Player Award, averaging 34.5 points, 14.1 rebounds and 2.12 blocks per game, while shooting 51.2 percent from the field and 80.5 percent from the free throw line. He also led the league in fan voting for the 1975 All-Star Game with 98,325 votes. McAdoo is the youngest player to have had a 50-point/20-rebound game. That season, with McAdoo aided by strong play from Jim McMillian and Randy Smith, the Braves would finish with an improved 49-33 record, though again they would lose in their first postseason matchup, this time a seven game series loss to Elvin Hayes, Wes Unseld, and the Washington Bullets

During the 1976 NBA Playoffs, McAdoo and the Braves would finally advance out of the first round, beating the Philadelphia 76ers as McAdoo averaged 30.3 points, 18.7 rebounds, and 4.3 assists in 47.3 minutes per game. However, in the following round the Braves would again be eliminated by the Boston Celtics, who would once again go on to win the finals.

The following season, on December 7, 1976, McAdoo grabbed a career-high 29 rebounds, while adding 42 points, in a 107-103 loss to the Indiana Pacers. Two days later, McAdoo was traded by the Buffalo Braves with Tom McMillen to the New York Knicks for John Gianelli and cash.

McAdoo's style was very modern for his time. In 334 games with Buffalo, McAdoo averaged 28.2 points, 12.7 rebounds, 2.6 assists, 2.4 blocks and 1.1 steals.

New York Knicks (1976–1979) 
In 52 games with the Knicks in 1976–77, McAdoo averaged 26.7 points, 12.7 rebounds, 2.7 assists, 1.3 blocks and 1.2 steals under Hall of Fame Coach Red Holtzman, as the Knicks finished 40–42, missing the playoffs. Joining the Knicks, McAdoo played alongside future Hall of Fame teammates Walt Frazier, Earl Monroe, Spencer Haywood, Bill Bradley and Phil Jackson.

In 1977–78, the Knicks, finished 43–39 under new Coach Willis Reed, as McAdoo averaged 26.5 points, 12.8 rebounds, 3.8 assists, 1.6 blocks and 1.3 steals in 79 games. The Knicks defeated the Cleveland Cavaliers 2–0 in the Eastern Conference Playoffs, before losing to the Philadelphia 76ers with Julius Erving 4–0 in the Eastern Conference semi-finals. McAdoo averaged 34.0 points, 9.0 rebounds and 2.0 assists in the Cavaliers series and 18.8 points, 10.0 rebounds, 4.8 assists 2.3 blocks and 1.5 steals in the 76ers series.

In 1978–79, the Knicks fired Willis Reed and rehired Red Holtzman mid-season. On January 23, 1979, McAdoo scored his most points scored as a Knick, with 45 in a 148-124 loss against the Los Angeles Lakers. After 40 games with the Knicks, McAdoo was averaging 26.9 points, 9.5 rebounds and 3.2 assists when he was traded. On February 12, 1979, McAdoo was traded by the Knicks to the Boston Celtics for Tom Barker, a 1979 1st round draft pick (Bill Cartwright was later selected), a 1979 1st round draft pick (Larry Demic was later selected) and a 1979 1st round draft pick (Sly Williams was later selected).

In 171 games with the Knicks, McAdoo averaged 26.7 points, 12.0 rebounds, 3.3 assists, 1.4 blocks and 1.3 steals.

Boston Celtics (1979) 
In his tenure with Boston under player/Coach Dave Cowens, Boston finished 29–53. McAdoo averaged 20.6 points, 7.1 rebounds, playing fewer minutes in a frontcourt with Cowens, Cedric Maxwell, Marvin Barnes and Rick Robey.

After the season Boston fired Cowens as coach, replaced him with Bill Fitch, and Larry Bird arrived from Indiana State. McAdoo was traded to Detroit.

On September 6, 1979 McAdoo was traded by the Celtics to the Detroit Pistons for a number one 1980 draft pick (Joe Barry Carroll was later selected) and a number 13 (1st round) 1980 draft pick (Rickey Brown was later selected). This exchange was arranged as compensation for Boston signing veteran free agent M.L. Carr on July 24, 1979. The number one pick Boston received was later traded to the Golden State Warriors who used it to select Carroll. In return, Boston received the #3 overall pick (used to select Kevin McHale) and center Robert Parish.

Detroit Pistons (1979–1981) 
In 1979–80, McAdoo joined a Pistons team that finished 16–66 under coaches Dick Vitale (4–8), who had encouraged the trade for McAdoo, and Vitale's replacement Richie Adubato (12–58). Playing alongside Hall of Famer Bob Lanier, McAdoo averaged 21.1 points and 8.1 rebounds in 58 games.

On March 11, 1981, McAdoo was waived by the Pistons after playing in only six games with the team in 1980–81, as Detroit finished 21–61.

On February 19, 1981, McAdoo, who had been injured,  claimed he was healthy and asked to be reinstated into the Pistons starting lineup. Coach Scotty Robertson denied his request, saying McAdoo had not practiced and wasn't in proper physical shape. McAdoo  asked to be allowed to go home and was allowed to leave.  The next day Pistons general manager Jack McCloskey notified McAdoo to not return for the rest of the season.  McAdoo was then waived.

New Jersey Nets (1981) 
On March 13, 1981, McAdoo signed as a free agent with the New Jersey Nets. He played ten games with the Nets, averaging 15 minutes per contest as the Nets finished 24–58.

Los Angeles Lakers (1981–1985) 
On December 24, 1981, McAdoo was traded by the New Jersey Nets to the Los Angeles Lakers for a 1983 2nd round draft pick (Kevin Williams was later selected). McAdoo had not played for the Nets in the 1981–82 season and Mitch Kupchak had become injured for the Lakers.

"As the 1981–82 season began, I was in the middle of a contract dispute with the New Jersey Nets. However, I couldn’t even play since I was still recovering from off-season surgery to have bone spurs removed from my foot. There were times, standing around on crutches for months, when I thought my career was over." McAdoo reflected, "But I got a call from the Lakers on Christmas Eve. They had just lost a key player, Mitch Kupchak, who blew out his knee. In the short term, they were hoping I could fill his void coming off the bench. In the long term, I think they were hoping I could help the team get headed in the right direction."

McAdoo had a memorable end to his NBA career, winning two NBA titles with the Los Angeles Lakers in 1982 and 1985 as a key reserve on the Showtime-era teams with Hall of Famers Magic Johnson, Kareem Abdul-Jabbar and James Worthy.  The former MVP was silently frustrated with not starting behind players such as Jim Brewer, Mark Landsberger, and Kurt Rambis, but sacrificed to be part of championship teams.

“That championship is the one thing I don’t have I’ll do whatever I need to get it.” McAdoo said in playing with the Lakers in 1982.

In 1981–82, the Lakers won the 1982 NBA Championship, as Pat Riley had taken over coaching from Paul Westhead. Riley and McAdoo thus began a professional relationship that continued for decades. In 41 games with the Lakers, McAdoo averaged 9.6 points and 3.9 rebounds in 18.2 minutes in the regular season. In the 1982 NBA Finals, McAdoo averaged 16.3 points in 27 minutes as the Lakers defeated the Philadelphia 76ers 4–2. In the entire playoffs, McAdoo averaged 16.7 points and 6.8 rebounds.

McAdoo resigned with the Lakers for the 1982–83 season, declining a more lucrative offer from the Philadelphia 76ers in order to remain with the Lakers.

Averaging 15.0 points in 1982-1983 and 13.1 points in 1983–84 for the Lakers in the next two seasons, the team finished 58–24 and 54–28. McAdoo played with a severely injured hamstring in the 1983 playoffs. "If we could have had Mac (McAdoo) healthy, we might have had a shot," coach Riley said after the 1983 loss to the Philadelphia 76ers in the NBA Finals.

McAdoo averaged 12.5 points and 5.5 rebounds as the Lakers lost 4–3 to the Boston Celtics in the 1984 NBA Finals.

McAdoo helped the Lakers to another NBA Championship in 1984–85, defeating Boston 4–2 in the NBA Finals. McAdoo was the 6th man, averaging 8.2 points and 3.0 rebounds in the 1985 NBA Finals and 11.4 points in the entire playoffs.

After the season, the Lakers did not re-sign McAdoo, instead offering a contract to veteran Maurice Lucas for the 6th man role.

“It was a great opportunity for me to play with Kareem and Magic,” McAdoo said of his tenure with the Lakers. “For the first time in my career, I had a chance to win a championship. But I had no thoughts at all in my mind about coming off the bench. It just happened. To me it was a wrap I would start. They didn’t have anyone who could stick with me at that position, but I dealt with it because I had never been on a championship team. And I’ve never been one to cause disruption or anything like that.”

Philadelphia 76ers (1986) 
On January 31, 1986, McAdoo signed as a free agent with the Philadelphia 76ers.

He finished his NBA career with 29 games for the Philadelphia 76ers in the 1985–86 season, averaging 10.1 points alongside Julius Erving, Moses Malone and Charles Barkley. McAdoo averaged 10.8 points in the 76ers two playoff series. In the final game of his NBA career, McAdoo scored 7 points and grabbed 4 rebounds in 12 minutes of playing time, during a 113-112 Game 7 semifinals loss to the Milwaukee Bucks.

NBA career totals 
In his NBA career, McAdoo scored 18,787 career points. He averaged 22.1 points, 9.4 rebounds, 2.3 assists, 1.5 blocks and 1.0 steals in 852 games. He played for the Buffalo Braves (1972–1976), New York Knicks (1976–1979), Boston Celtics (1979), Detroit Pistons (1979–1981), New Jersey Nets (1980–1981), Los Angeles Lakers (1981–1985) and Philadelphia 76ers (1986).

Italian League (1987–1992) 
After his NBA career ended, McAdoo played in Italy, first playing with Olimpia Milano, as one of the best American players ever seen in Europe, and the FIBA European Champions Cup (now known as the EuroLeague). McAdoo played with Olimpia Milano from the 1986–87 season, to the 1989–90 season. He led the club to two straight FIBA European Champions Cup (EuroLeague) titles, in the 1986–87 and 1987–88 seasons, being named the EuroLeague Final Four MVP in 1988. With the same club, he also won the FIBA Intercontinental Cup (1987), two Italian League championships (1987, 1989), and the Italian Cup (1987).

Later, he played with the Italian clubs Filanto Forlì (1990–92) and Teamsystem Fabriano (1992), before retiring from playing professional basketball, in 1992, at age 41. In his last season, he retired after playing in just 2 games. In seven seasons in the Italian League, McAdoo played in 201 games, and averaged 27.0 points and 8.9 rebounds per game. In three seasons in the EuroLeague, all as a member of Olimpia Milano, he averaged 25.8 points per game overall, averaging 21.8 points per game in 1986–87, 29.1 points per game in 1987–88, and 25.5 points per game in 1989–90.

Coaching/scouting career
Beginning in 1995, McAdoo has worked 25 years for the Miami Heat. He was an assistant coach for 19 seasons under Pat Riley (1995–2003, 2005–2008), Stan Van Gundy (2003–2005) and Erik Spoelstra (2008–2013), winning three NBA championships. He has since worked the last five seasons as a scout and community liaison for Miami.

McAdoo came to the Heat organization when Pat Riley, who had been his coach for two championship seasons with the Lakers in the 1980s, left the New York Knicks to become the Heat's head coach and GM in 1995. Riley quickly reached out to McAdoo to join his coaching staff.

Personal life

McAdoo's wife, Charlina, died of cancer in 1991. They had four children together - sons Robert III and Russell and his daughter Rita live in New Jersey, while their other son, Ross, lives in Alaska.

McAdoo and his wife, Patrizia, whom he met while playing professionally in Italy, live in Boca Raton, Florida. They have two children. Their daughter Rasheeda graduated from Georgia Tech where she played on the tennis team and qualified for The 2017 NCAA Singles Championship. She plays professional tennis. Their son Ryan is a basketball player at the University of North Carolina.

In 2010, McAdoo took part in the Basketball Without Borders program in Singapore, which uses sport to create a positive social change in areas of education, health and wellness. He also participated in the program in Beijing in 2009 and the NBA Legends Tour to South Africa in 1993, a goodwill mission to promote the NBA. McAdoo was also the basketball technical adviser for the 1993 feature film, "The Air Up There", starring Kevin Bacon.

In 2012, McAdoo was treated for a blood clot in his leg.

McAdoo's second cousin, Ronnie McAdoo, is the father of James Michael McAdoo, who also played for the Tar Heels basketball team and turned pro in 2014.

Honors
 In 1993, McAdoo was inducted into the North Carolina Sports Hall of Fame.
 McAdoo was inducted into the Greater Buffalo Sports Hall of Fame in 1995.
 McAdoo was enshrined in the Naismith Memorial Basketball Hall of Fame in 2000.
 In 2006, McAdoo was inducted into the College Basketball Hall of Fame.
 In 2008, he was named to the 50 Greatest EuroLeague Contributors.
 McAdoo was inducted into the Olimpia Milano Hall of Fame, in 2013,.
 In 2016, the gymnasium at Ben L. Smith High School (Guilford County School District) was named after McAdoo.
 In 2019, McAdoo was honored, along with seven others, by the University of North Carolina on a banner displaying UNC alumni who had been elected to the Naismith Basketball Hall of Fame.
 McAdoo is a member of the Guilford County Sports Hall of Fame.
 In 2021, McAdoo was elected to the NBA 75th Anniversary Team.

NBA career statistics

Regular season 

|-
| style="text-align:left;"| 
| style="text-align:left;"|Buffalo
| 80 || – || 32.0 || .452 || – || .774 || 9.1 || 1.7 || – || – || 18.0
|-
| style="text-align:left;"| 
| style="text-align:left;"|Buffalo
| 74 || – || 43.0 ||style="background:#cfecec;"| .547* || – || .793 || 15.1 || 2.3 || 1.2 || 3.3 ||style="background:#cfecec;"| 30.6*
|-
| style="text-align:left;"| 
| style="text-align:left;"|Buffalo
| 82 || – || style="background:#cfecec;"|43.2* || .512 || – || .805 || 14.1 || 2.2 || 1.1 || 2.1 ||style="background:#cfecec;"| 34.5*
|-
| style="text-align:left;"| 
| style="text-align:left;"|Buffalo
| 78 || – ||style="background:#cfecec;"| 42.7* || .487 || – || .762 || 12.4 || 4.0 || 1.2 || 2.1 || style="background:#cfecec;"|31.1*
|-
| style="text-align:left;"| 
| style="text-align:left;"|Buffalo
| 20 || – || 38.4 || .455 || – || .696 || 13.2 || 3.3 || 0.8 || 1.7 || 23.7
|-
| style="text-align:left;"| 
| style="text-align:left;"|New York
| 52 || – || 39.1 || .534 || – || .757 || 12.7 || 2.7 || 1.2 || 1.3 || 26.7
|-
| style="text-align:left;"| 
| style="text-align:left;"|New York
| 79 || – || 40.3 || .520 || – || .727 || 12.8 || 3.8 || 1.3 || 1.6 || 26.5
|-
| style="text-align:left;"| 
| style="text-align:left;"|New York
| 40 || – || 39.9 || .541 || – || .651 || 9.5 || 3.2 || 1.6 || 1.2 || 26.9
|-
| style="text-align:left;"| 
| style="text-align:left;"|Boston
| 20 || – || 31.9 || .500 || – || .670 || 7.1 || 2.0 || 0.6 || 1.0 || 20.6
|-
| style="text-align:left;"| 
| style="text-align:left;"|Detroit
| 58 || – || 36.2 || .480 || .125 || .730 || 8.1 || 3.4 || 1.3 || 1.1 || 21.1
|-
| style="text-align:left;"| 
| style="text-align:left;"|Detroit
| 6 || – || 28.0 || .366 || – || .600 || 6.8 || 3.3 || 1.3 || 1.2 || 12.0
|-
| style="text-align:left;"| 
| style="text-align:left;"|New Jersey
| 10 || – || 15.3 || .507 || .000 || .810 || 2.6 || 1.0 || 0.9 || 0.6 || 9.3
|-
| style="text-align:left;background:#afe6ba;"| †
| style="text-align:left;"|L.A. Lakers
| 41 || 0 || 18.2 || .458 || .000 || .714 || 3.9 || 0.8 || 0.5 || 0.9 || 9.6
|-
| style="text-align:left;"| 
| style="text-align:left;"|L.A. Lakers
| 47 || 1 || 21.7 || .520 || .000 || .730 || 5.3 || 0.8 || 0.9 || 0.9 || 15.0
|-
| style="text-align:left;"| 
| style="text-align:left;"|L.A. Lakers
| 70 || 0 || 20.8 || .471 || .000 || .803 || 4.1 || 1.1 || 0.6 || 0.7 || 13.1
|-
| style="text-align:left;background:#afe6ba;"| †
| style="text-align:left;"|L.A. Lakers
| 66 || 0 || 19.0 || .520 || .000 || .753 || 4.5 || 1.0 || 0.3 || 0.8 || 10.5
|-
| style="text-align:left;"| 
| style="text-align:left;"|Philadelphia
| 29 || 0 || 21.0 || .462 || – || .765 || 3.6 || 1.2 || 0.3 || 0.6 || 10.1
|- class="sortbottom"
| style="text-align:center;" colspan="2"| Career
| 852 || 1 || 33.2 || .503 || .081 || .754 || 9.4 || 2.3 || 1.0 || 1.5 || 22.1

|- class="sortbottom"
| style="text-align:center;" colspan="2"| All-Star
| 5 || 3 || 25.2 || .578 || – || .737 || 6.0 || 1.2 || 0.8 || 0.4 || 17.6

Playoffs 

|-
|style="text-align:left;"|1974
|style="text-align:left;”|Buffalo
|6||–||45.2||.478||–||.809||13.7||1.5||1.0||2.2||31.7
|-
|style="text-align:left;"|1975
|style="text-align:left;”|Buffalo
|7||–||style="background:#cfecec;"|46.7*||.481||–||.740||13.4||1.4||0.9||2.7||style="background:#cfecec;"|37.4*
|-
|style="text-align:left;"|1976
|style="text-align:left;”|Buffalo
|9||–||style="background:#cfecec;"|45.1*||.451||–||.707||14.2||3.2||0.8||2.0||28.0
|-
|style="text-align:left;"|1978
|style="text-align:left;”|New York
|6||–||39.7||.484||–||.600||9.7||3.8||1.2||2.0||23.8
|-
| style="text-align:left;background:#afe6ba;"|1982†
|style="text-align:left;”|L.A. Lakers
|14||–||27.7||.564||–||.681||6.8||1.6||0.7||1.5||16.7
|-
|style="text-align:left;"|1983
|style="text-align:left;”|L.A. Lakers
|8||–||20.8||.440||.333||.786||5.8||0.6||1.4||1.3||10.9
|-
|style="text-align:left;"|1984
|style="text-align:left;”|L.A. Lakers
|20||–||22.4||.516||.000||.704||5.4||0.6||0.6||1.4||14.0
|-
| style="text-align:left;background:#afe6ba;"|1985†
|style="text-align:left;”|L.A. Lakers
|19||0||20.9||.472||.000||.745||4.5||0.8||0.5||1.4||11.4
|-
|style="text-align:left;"|1986
|style="text-align:left;”|Philadelphia
|5||0||14.6||.556||–||.875||2.8||0.4||0.8||1.0||10.8
|- class="sortbottom"
| style="text-align:center;" colspan="2"| Career
| 94 || 0 || 28.9 || .491 || .250 || .724 || 7.6 || 1.4 || 0.8 || 1.6 || 18.3

See also
 List of National Basketball Association annual scoring leaders
 List of National Basketball Association single-game playoff scoring leaders
 List of National Basketball Association annual minutes leaders

References

External links

 
 Bob McAdoo at nba.com (Player)
 Bob McAdoo at nba.com (Coach)
 Bob McAdoo at legabasket.it 
 Bob McAdoo at olimpiamilano.com
 Buffalo Braves team history book - "Buffalo , Home of the Braves"

1951 births
Living people
African-American basketball coaches
African-American basketball players
American expatriate basketball people in Italy
American men's basketball players
Basketball coaches from North Carolina
Basketball players at the 1971 Pan American Games
Basketball players from Greensboro, North Carolina
Boston Celtics players
Buffalo Braves draft picks
Buffalo Braves players
Centers (basketball)
Detroit Pistons players
Los Angeles Lakers players
Miami Heat assistant coaches
Naismith Memorial Basketball Hall of Fame inductees
National Basketball Association All-Stars
New Jersey Nets players
New York Knicks players
North Carolina Tar Heels men's basketball players
Olimpia Milano players
Pan American Games competitors for the United States
People from Ramsey, New Jersey
Philadelphia 76ers players
Power forwards (basketball)
Sportspeople from Greensboro, North Carolina
Vincennes Trailblazers men's basketball players
21st-century African-American people
20th-century African-American sportspeople